Gottfried von Preyer (15 March 1807 – 9 May 1901) was an Austrian composer, conductor and teacher.

Preyer studied with Simon Sechter from 1828 to 1834. He became professor of harmony and composition at the Vienna Conservatory in 1839, and from 1844 to 1849 he was director of the conservatory. He was also Vizehofkapellmeister and Domkapellmeister of St. Stephan.

He founded children's hospital Gottfried von Preyer'sches Kinderspital bearing his name.

He was born in Hausbrunn and died in Vienna.

References
 Biography (in German)
 German Wikipedia article
Biographical information

External links
 

Austrian male composers
Austrian composers
Austrian conductors (music)
Male conductors (music)
1807 births
1901 deaths
19th-century male musicians